James Mellor (1870 – after 1895) was an English footballer who played in the Football League for Stoke.

Career
Mellor was born in Stoke-upon-Trent and played for Dresden United before joining Stoke where he made one appearance which came in a 3–1 defeat to Nottingham Forest in February 1895 due to an injury to Joe Schofield. He re-entered amateur football with Stone BL.

Career statistics

References

1870 births
Year of death missing
Footballers from Stoke-on-Trent
English footballers
Association football outside forwards
Dresden United F.C. players
Stoke City F.C. players
English Football League players